Bionta is a defunct taxon created by Lee Barker Walton in 1930, to denominate all the living beings. It was divided up into three subkingdoms; Protistodeae, Metaphytodeae (multicellular plants), and Zoodeae (multicellular animals).

See also

 Aphanobionta
 Biota (taxonomy)
 Cytota

References
WALTON, Lee Barker: "Studies Concerning Organisms Occurring in Water Supplies With Particular Reference to Those Founded in Ohio" in Ohio Biological Survey Bulletin, 24 (1930), pp. 1–86, .

Obsolete taxa